Sarah "Pease" Glaser (born November 18, 1961) is an American sailor. She won a silver medal in the 470 class at the 2000 Summer Olympics with J. J. Isler. Glaser was born in Springfield, Illinois.

References

External links
 
 
 

1961 births
Living people
Sportspeople from Springfield, Illinois
Alamitos Bay Yacht Club sailors
American female sailors (sport)
Sailors at the 2000 Summer Olympics – 470
Olympic silver medalists for the United States in sailing
Medalists at the 2000 Summer Olympics
US Sailor of the Year
21st-century American women
20th-century American women